Alternate-side parking is a traffic law that dictates on which side of a street cars can be parked on a given day. The law is intended to promote efficient flow of traffic, as well as to allow street sweepers and snowplows to reach the curb without parked cars impeding their progress. Some proponents also regard the law, which can be quite inconvenient for drivers, as a way to encourage the use of public transportation.

In many towns and cities, alternate-side parking is reserved for certain times of year, or only used during a snow emergency.

Around the world

New York City
From the beginning, the New York City alternate-side parking law was "assailed" by opponents as actually impeding the efficient flow of traffic. The system was created by either Paul Rogers Screvane, while a sanitation commissioner in Queens, New York, or Isidore Cohen, a Sanitation Department employee who later rose to Manhattan borough superintendent. 

The law is a year-round rule, suspended only for holidays and certain events. Signs are posted with the scheduled street sweeping times, and drivers must make sure their vehicles are on the correct side of the street or risk being ticketed or towed. The law can be confusing to visitors, who often choose to park in high-priced parking garages or use valet parking rather than risking fines. Even for locals, parking tickets are common; working late or oversleeping may cause a car to be left for too long on the wrong side of the street. Avoiding a ticket can consume a great deal of time, as drivers must search for other available spaces or sit double parked until the designated time, regardless of when street sweepers actually pass.

Example
On a street running east to west, cars must be moved from the south side of the street for a few hours a day every Monday, Wednesday and Friday. On Tuesday, Thursday, and Saturday they must be moved from the north side. On Sunday and certain holidays, they can be left where they are. The specific times will vary from street to street. The days on which the rules are suspended may also vary from city to city and even from neighbourhood to neighbourhood. Apps and services like SpotAngels offer crowdsourced maps of NYC alternate side parking rules.

Sweden

In Sweden, alternate-side parking (datumparkering) is applied in zones covering an entire city, with signs indicating this at the city perimeter. Inside such date zones (datumzon), parking is prohibited on the morning of odd dates on the side of the street where houses have odd numbers. The drivers must think of what date it is the next morning if they leave the car in the evening. Inspired by Stockholm, more and more Swedish cities are abandoning such confusing zones and instead provide permanent parking on one or both sides of the street, with the exception for one day per week from December to May, when snow ploughing and sweeping of sand can be required. The day when parking is prohibited is posted on a sign for each street.

Denmark
In Denmark (datoparkering), the rules are exactly the opposite of those in Sweden, with parking prohibited on the morning of odd dates on the side of the street where houses have even numbers.

Belgium

Belgium allows a half-monthly parking rule (Dutch: Halfmaandelijks beurtelings parkeren, French: Stationnement alterné semi-mensuel). When the entrance of the town is marked by road sign E11, alternate-side parking applies to the whole town agglomeration. Parking on the road from the 1st till the 15th of each month is only allowed on the side of the road with odd house numbers; from the 16th till the end of the month, parking on the road is only allowed on the side of the road with even house numbers. At the end of each period, cars should change sides between 19.30 and 20.00. The rule doesn't apply on parking spots outside the roadway or on dedicated spots marked by other parking rules.

France

Similar parking regulations exist in France.

Spain

In Spain some cities have similar parking regulations. In Barcelona, for example, the parking side in small streets changes every three months. In these streets, every street side has a sign showing the regular parking conditions, an additional sign below shows the dates when parking on this side of the street is allowed and prohibited.

Other countries
 

In most other countries, like in the Netherlands, the street sweep vehicle is usually accompanied by a few street sweeping persons, who go around the parked cars with brooms. They bring the garbage from around the parked cars to the road, from where the sweep vehicle takes it over. This way, citizens do not have to move their parked cars.

Popular culture
In the Seinfeld episode "The Alternate Side," George Costanza gets a job moving cars from one side of the street to the other.
The novel Tepper Isn't Going Out is based on the quest for parking in New York City.
In the Golden Girls episode "An Illegitimate Concern", Rose explains how the inhabitants of her hometown of Saint Olaf were confused by opposite side of the street parking as, 'It doesn't matter which side of the street you park on, there's ALWAYS an opposite SIDE...'
In The Order of the Stick, goblins allegedly invented alternate-side parking, in addition to the oboe and guacamole, thus securing their place among the damned.
In The West Wing episode "Transition", CJ Cregg jokes about moving the furniture around the Chief of Staff office on a daily basis, "like alternate side of the street parking."
In the MF Doom song Gazillion Ear, the New York City rapper mentions that he is "In effect like alternate side of the street parking rules."

References

Traffic law
Parking law